The Leamington–Stratford line is a railway line linking Leamington Spa and Stratford-upon-Avon in Warwickshire, England. It follows the Chiltern Main Line from Leamington Spa to Hatton before diverging to the south. It serves Stratford-upon-Avon, Wilmcote, Bearley, Claverdon, Hatton, Warwick, and Leamington Spa. At Wilmcote, it joins the North Warwickshire Line. 

Passenger services are primarily operated by Chiltern Railways. They replaced the previous operator, First Great Western Link, in early 2005. Some services are operated by West Midlands Railway which run between Birmingham Snow Hill and Stratford-upon-Avon via Solihull.

Rail transport in Warwickshire
Railway lines in the West Midlands (region)